Varmint hunting or varminting is the practice of hunting vermin — generally small/medium-sized wild mammals or birds — as a means of pest control, rather than as games for food or trophy.  The targeted animals are culled because they are considered economically harmful pests to agricultural crops, livestocks or properties; pathogen-carrying hosts/vectors that transmit cross-species/zoonotic diseases; or for population control as a mean of protecting other vulnerable species and ecosystems.

The term "varminter" may refer to a varmint hunter, or describe the hunting equipments (such as a varmint rifle) either specifically designed or coincidentally suitable for the practice of varmint hunting.  Varmint hunters may hunt to exterminate a nuisance animal from their own property, to collect a bounty offered by another landowner or the government, or simply as a hobby.

Targets of varmint hunting 

The term varmint is a US colloquial term for vermin, though it refers more specifically to mammalian or avian pests, including:
 Predators which can kill/maim domestic animals: badger, coyote, foxes, mink, raccoons, snakes, snapping turtles, weasel, and wolverine.
 Rodents and lagomorphs that can damage croplands or pastures: beaver, gophers, groundhogs, muskrat, coypu (also known as nutria), prairie dogs, porcupine, and rabbits.
 Urban wildlife that can cause damage to buildings and properties, create mess/fecal pollutions, or carry disease: feral pigeons, rats, and squirrels.
 Birds perceived as damaging to crops: crows and ravens, sparrows, as well as passenger pigeons and Carolina parakeets, both of which were driven to extinction in part by pressure from indiscriminate hunting. 
 Invasive species, such as starlings and wild boar/hogs, that are preying on or displacing desirable native species.

Equipment

Blowgun 
Shorter blowguns and smaller bore darts were used for varmint hunting by pre-adolescent boys in traditional North American Cherokees villages. They used the blowguns to cut down on smaller raiding rodents such as rats, mice, chipmunks and other mammals that cut or gnaw into food caches, seed and vegetable stores, or that are attracted to the planted vegetables.  While this custom gave the boys something to do around the village and kept them out of mischief, it also worked as an early form of pest control. Some food and skins were also obtained by the boys, who hunted squirrels with blowguns well into the 20th century.

Airgun 
Air rifles are commonly used in built-up environments, where the targets might not be particularly far away but are high up on trees/structures or in obscure corners, and the risk of overpenetration, ricochets and stray shots need to be minimized.  Airguns are more powerful and accurate than blowguns, but much quieter and with less terminal damage than firearms, and thus more suitable in urban and suburban environments where noise complaint and ballistic safety can be an issue.

Firearms 

Since varmint hunting is a form of pest control, and minimally regulated by law, the definition of what constitutes a varmint firearm tends to vary by regional pests. The definitive varmints are ground burrowing animals such as groundhogs and prairie dogs.  These animals are small, alert and difficult to approach closely, and hunting them requires a long-range, highly accurate rifle.  Because of this, models labelled "Varminter" will generally fit the following characteristics:
 high-velocity caliber, for a flat trajectory (see external ballistics)
 lightweight projectile, designed for minimum overpenetration (see terminal ballistics)
 extreme accuracy, for the ability to hit small targets at long range (see accurizing)
 heavier barrel, for more consistent internal ballistics so the gun can be fired more frequently without its precision being detrimented by heat build-up

Examples

 Bushmaster AR-15 based Varminter model; includes extended heavy barrel, adjustable trigger, and no iron sights (being designed for dedicated use with telescopic sights).
 Remington 700 SPS: Has a 26" heavy contour barrel with standard features that include a hinged floorplate magazine, sling swivel studs, and a drilled and tapped receiver.
 Ruger No. 1 Varminter single-shot rifle; equipped with scope base and rings for telescopic sight, available in high velocity calibers with extended heavy barrels.  While the trigger is factory set and locked, the trigger does include sear engagement and overtravel adjustment screws, which can be adjusted by a gunsmith.
 Savage Model 12 Varminter; includes adjustable trigger, and free floated extended heavy barrel, no iron sights, and a benchrest style stock.
 Sierra Varminter line of bullets; light weight, hollow point and soft point bullets designed for high velocities, minimal penetration, and maximum expansion needed for varmints.

Impacts on varmint populations 
Hunting of varmint has typically been to reduce crop loss and to stop predation of livestock. This hunting has imposed an artificial selection pressure on the organisms being hunted. The selection pressure on varmints is probably for younger reproduction ages and earlier maturity. Varmint hunting is also potentially selecting for behavioral changes that are desired, animals avoiding human populated areas, crops, and livestock.

See also 
 Nuisance wildlife management
 Pest control
 Rat-catcher
 Vermin

References 

Hunting by game